K. L. Mohana Varma (born 1936) is a Malayalam–language novelist, short story writer and journalist from the Indian state of Kerala. Varma is known for pioneering fiction with a subject-based theme in Malayalam story-telling. His novels Ohari, Cricket, Neethi, reflect this form. His humorous columns and articles on contemporary politics, business and sports are popular. He has 66 published works, including 2 novels in English. His books are translated into many Indian languages. He has more than 15 awards for his works. He made two documentaries and a children's film.

Early life 
He holds an Accounts and Management degree.

Career 
He was Chief Editor of Paico publications, Secretary of Kerala Sahitya Academy and Chief Editor of Veekshanam Daily and Puzha.com, which is Malayalam's top internet magazine. He has lectured in many places including American universities. He regularly visits Indian villages to maintain his sensitivity to the lives of his subjects.

He is President of Kerala History Association and President of Kerala Sahityas Mandalam and ex-officio member of Govt. committees on official language, Malayalam mission etc.

Varma is a frequent speaker at cultural events.

Bibliography

Novels 

 Rithusandhi
 Aaranya parvam
 Yavanika
 Serial
 V Cube
 Shapam
 Chambal
 Jalarekhakal
 Pretham
 Innaleyude Bakki
 Ohari
 Vrindavanathile Radha
 Neethi
 Nakshatrangalude Thadavukaari
 Short Circuit
 Cinema Cinema
 Mahabaliyude Makkal
 Private Limited
 Chathurangam
 Ayaanayam
 Stock Exchange
 Cricket
 Santhvanam
 Thrippadi Danam
 Sukham
 Parppidam
 Adhinivesham
 Settlement
 Kochi
 Goal
 Amaavasi (With Madavikkutty)
 Abhinayam
 Rajasooyam

Fiction 

 From Basthar With Love
 Nee
 Mochanam
 Pratheeksha
 Nammal Pathikar
 Yours Obediently
 Appointmmentillatha Athithi
 Gulf Kathakal
 Akaleyulla Koodarangal
 Rosemary
 Penguin
 Mohanavarmayude Sthreekal
 Kaayiyude Noottand
 Vazhiyorakkazhchakal
 Bharthruhariyude Kuthirakkaran

Satire 

 Professorude Lokam
 Anaswrathayude Gatha
 Kariyachante Lokam
 Acadameeyam
 From Varmaji With Love

Travelogue 

 Budhan Piranna Mannil
 Cherippum Ahanthayum
 Professor in America

Children's Literature 

 Chasharasaha Mira

Others 

 Mobi Dick (Fantacy)
 Nikkiyum Computer Virusum
 Thinkalkkuri

References 

1936 births
Living people
Journalists from Kerala
Indian columnists
Malayali people
People from Ernakulam district
Novelists from Kerala
Malayalam-language writers
Malayalam-language journalists
Recipients of the Kerala Sahitya Akademi Award
Malayalam novelists
Malayalam short story writers
20th-century Indian short story writers
Indian male short story writers
Indian male journalists
Indian male novelists
20th-century Indian novelists
20th-century Indian male writers